Photoflamingo is the fifth studio album by Crack the Sky. It was released on LP in 1981 by Lifesong Records (catalog #LS-8133).

Track listing

Personnel

The band
John Palumbo – Lead vocals, rhythm, lead, and acoustic guitars
Vince DePaul – Acoustic and synthetic keyboards
John Tracey – Drums
Carey Ziegler – Bass guitar
Michael Taylor – Lead guitar ("A Girl Like You", "Good Child Gone Wild", "With the Morons")

Additional musicians
Tom McCormick — The Crack Pack Horns
Chris Walker – The Crack Pack Horns
Ellery Eskelin — The Crack Pack Horns
Chuck Klapka – The Crack Pack Horns
The Softones — Back-up vocals ("Is All We Know")

Production
Jeffrey D. Sharp – Executive producer
John Palumbo – Producer
Victor Giordano – Engineer, digital mixdown
Razor Boy Ron Carran – Digital mixdown

Additional credits
Recorded at Flite III Recordings, Ltd.
Digital mixdown at Minot Sound, Inc.
Al Wilson – Road Manager, Master of Ceremonies
Tom Hanlon – The Crack Crew
Randy Siegmeister – The Crack Crew
Paul Giansante – The Crack Crew
Hank Coldbert – The Crack Crew
John Palumbo – Cover concept
Consuelo y Regan – Layout
Arnie Rivkind (for Commercial Fotographics, Ltd.) — Photography
Special thanks: Richard Klotzman, Cindy Markus, Don Wehner, Gordon Miller Music, Maryland Sound Industries, Danny Palumbo & Crack Video, Lou Dollenger, Henry Rosenberg, The Molson Sky Team, Fast Eddie Wannebo, Mary, Julie, Terri and all of our Families

Trivia
The model on the cover is John's wife, Mary Palumbo

Sources
LP liner notes

1981 albums
Crack the Sky albums